Cocculinella minutissima is a species of small, deep water sea snail, a marine gastropod mollusk in the family Cocculinellidae, the limpets.

Description
The shell grows to a size of 3.5 mm, width 1.5 mm and height 1 mm. The thin, white shell is long and narrow with growth rings.  The sides are almost parallel,
slightly bent, slightly truncated at the back. The nipple-shaped apex stands out and drops quite sharply backwards. It is located about in front of the center. The front drops in a straight line and is slightly convex at the rear.

Distribution
This marine species occurs in the Pacific Ocean off Japan and in the Indian Ocean off the Andaman Islands.

References

External links
 To Biodiversity Heritage Library (1 publication)
 To World Register of Marine Species
 

Cocculinellidae
Gastropods described in 1904